Konstantina Koutra (born 17 October 1979) is a Greek alpine skier. She competed in the women's slalom at the 2002 Winter Olympics.

References

1979 births
Living people
Greek female alpine skiers
Olympic alpine skiers of Greece
Alpine skiers at the 2002 Winter Olympics
Sportspeople from Larissa